Vadim Yuryevich Romanov (born 3 May 1978) is a Russian professional football coach and a former player. He is the head coach of the Under-19 squad of FC Spartak Moscow.

External links
 

1978 births
People from Yegoryevsk
Living people
Russian footballers
Association football defenders
Russian expatriate footballers
Expatriate footballers in Belarus
FC Metallurg Lipetsk players
FC Khimki players
FC Naftan Novopolotsk players
FC Oryol players
FC SKA-Khabarovsk players
Belarusian Premier League players
FC Spartak-2 Moscow players
Sportspeople from Moscow Oblast